Bong-2 is an electoral district for the elections to the House of Representatives of Liberia. The constituency covers three wards of Gbanga city (wards 5, 8 and 9), 10 communities of Jorquelleh District (i.e. Kolleta-Mula-Two, Beh-Lah-Three, Beletanta-Two, Tomue-Five, Mano-Weasue-Three, Samay-One, Jankpayah-Four, Gbenequellen-Two, Tamay Ta-One, Janyea-Four) and 2 communities of Yeallequelleh District (i.e. Yeanawoun-One and Garwuquelleh-Two).

Elected representatives

References

Electoral districts in Liberia